The General Service Corps (GSC) is a corps of the British Army.

Role
The role of the corps is to provide specialists, who are usually on the Special List or General List. These lists were used in both World Wars for specialists and those not allocated to other regiments or corps. In World War II, they were used for male operatives of the Special Operations Executive (female operatives joined the FANY).

History
The General Service Corps itself was formed in February 1942. From 2 July 1942, army recruits were enlisted in the corps for their first six weeks so that their subsequent posting could take account of their skills and the Army's needs. A similar role, holding some recruits pending allocation to their units, continues today.
Bermuda Militia Infantry soldiers absorbed into the Bermuda Militia Artillery before demobilisation in 1946 wore the General Service Corps cap badge instead of the Royal Artillery cap badge.

Insignia

From 1914, for the General List and later the General Service Corps, the cap badge has been the Royal Arms, with variously a king's or a queen's crown, depending on the reigning monarch. It bears the motto of the monarch Dieu et mon droit and the Order of the Garter motto Honi soit qui mal y pense. As a result, a GSC nickname was 'Crosse and Blackwell' after the firm whose tins and jar labels had a prominent royal coat of arms. The same capbadge has been used for other British Army regiments and corps for which no unique badge has been authorised, including the Royal Reserve Regiments, the later Royal Garrison Regiment, and the Bermuda Militia Infantry.

Notable personnel
Notable members of the General List/General Service Corps include:
 Terence Atherton
 Walter Freud
 Peter Lake
 T. E. Lawrence (Lawrence of Arabia)
 Bob Maloubier
 John Pendlebury
 Tracy Philipps
 Arthur Staggs

Order of precedence
The corps is twenty-second in the British Army's order of precedence.

References

British administrative corps
Military units and formations established in 1914